Michael Nicholson Lord, Baron Framlingham (born 17 October 1938) is a British politician, and was a Conservative Member of Parliament for Central Suffolk and North Ipswich between 1997 and 2010. He was first elected for the predecessor seat of Central Suffolk in 1983.

He was the Second Deputy Chairman of Ways and Means, one of the Deputy Speakers of the House of Commons, from 1997 to 2010.

Early life
He attended Christ's College, Cambridge, where he gained an MA in agriculture in 1962 and a blue for rugby union as a centre. He also played club rugby for Bedford. He is a former president of the Arboricultural Association.

Parliamentary career
He contested Manchester Gorton in 1979 and was first elected as an MP for Central Suffolk in 1983.

He was a Deputy Speaker of the House of Commons from 1997, and therefore did not take political stances or vote in the Chamber.  Before his position, he was one of the Maastricht Rebels. He was knighted in the 2001 Birthday Honours.

He stood down as an MP at the 2010 general election.

On 19 November 2010, it was announced that he would be created a life peer and sit as a Conservative in the House of Lords. Created on 14 January 2011 and introduced into the House of Lords on 18 January 2011, he took the title Baron Framlingham, of Eye in the County of Suffolk. Though life peers usually use their surname in their title, Framlingham was advised he could not become "Lord Lord"; though this nickname has since been used occasionally in jest.

Personal life
He married Jennifer Margaret Childs in 1965 and they have a son and daughter.

Arms

References

External links
 Guardian Unlimited Politics – Ask Aristotle: Sir Michael Lord MP
 TheyWorkForYou.com – Michael Lord MP
 Central Suffolk and North Ipswich Conservatives
 BBC Politics

1938 births
Deputy Speakers of the British House of Commons
Living people
Conservative Party (UK) MPs for English constituencies
Members of the Privy Council of the United Kingdom
Alumni of Christ's College, Cambridge
Cambridge University R.U.F.C. players
Bedford Blues players
Councillors in Bedfordshire
UK MPs 1983–1987
UK MPs 1987–1992
UK MPs 1992–1997
UK MPs 1997–2001
UK MPs 2001–2005
UK MPs 2005–2010
Knights Bachelor
People educated at William Hulme's Grammar School
Conservative Party (UK) life peers
Life peers created by Elizabeth II
British Eurosceptics
Politicians awarded knighthoods